Oxclose Community Academy (formerly Oxclose Community School) is a coeducational secondary school located in Oxclose in the City of Sunderland, Tyne and Wear, England.

The school was rebuilt in 2007 under the Building Schools for the Future programme. Previously a community school administered by Sunderland City Council, Oxclose Community School converted to academy status in November 2012 and was renamed Oxclose Community Academy. However the school continues to coordinate with Sunderland City Council for admissions.

Oxclose Community Academy offers GCSEs and BTECs as programmes of study for pupils. Graduating students usually go on to attend Usworth Sixth Form or Sunderland College. The school is also the location of the North East of England Japanese Saturday School. It is also the second location of the Pauline Cook School of Dance.

Notable former pupils
George Clarke, architect
Adam Barnes, Newcastle Eagles Professional Basketball Player 
Daniel Chapman, bassist with The Loves and Pocketbooks

References

External links
Oxclose Community Academy official website

Secondary schools in the City of Sunderland
Academies in the City of Sunderland
Washington, Tyne and Wear